Shut Yer Dirty Little Mouth! is a 2001 American comedy film starring Glenn Shadix.  It is based on Gregg Gibbs' play Shut Up Little Man.

Plot
A comical look into the lives of Raymond and Peter, two elderly alcoholics who do nothing, but rant, rave and argue with each other in an explosive, yet contained environment.

Cast
Gill Gayle as Raymond
Glenn Shadix as Peter
Robert Musgrave as Tony
Pat Quinn
Christopher Cameron as Policeman 2
Rachel Niebur as Downstair Neighbor

References

External links
 
 

2001 films
American comedy films
American films based on plays
2001 comedy films
2000s English-language films
2000s American films